"Shot in the Dark" is a single by Australian rock band AC/DC from their seventeenth studio album Power Up. The song was recorded late 2018 to early 2019. It was released on 7 October 2020, and is the band's first single released since 2015's "Rock the Blues Away" from their album Rock or Bust. The song was used as the official theme for WWE Survivor Series.

The song was nominated for two Grammys for the 64th Grammy Awards, Best Rock Performance and Best Music Video.

At the APRA Music Awards of 2022, the song was nominated for Most Performed Rock Work.

Music video
The music video, directed by David Mallet, premiered on AC/DC's YouTube channel on 26 October 2020.

Release
On 1 October 2020, the band teased the new single in a 30-second video posted on Twitter, appearing to power up the amp with its iconic lightning bolt logo while playing the song, and noting PWR/UP, short for Power Up. AC/DC went on hiatus after completing their Rock or Bust tour in 2016, which featured Guns N' Roses singer, Axl Rose. In 2018, members Brian Johnson, Phil Rudd, and Cliff Williams rejoined the band after the two-year hiatus. On 5 October 2020, the band shared another short clip composed of behind-the-scenes footage featuring brief appearances by all five members of the band.

Personnel

AC/DC
Brian Johnson – lead vocals
Angus Young – lead guitar
Stevie Young – rhythm guitar, backing vocals
Cliff Williams – bass, backing vocals
Phil Rudd – drums

Additional personnel
Brendan O'Brien – production
Mike Fraser – engineering, mixing
Ryan Smith – mastering
Billy Bowers – additional engineering

Charts

Weekly charts

Year-end charts

References

2020 singles
2019 songs
AC/DC songs
Columbia Records singles
Song recordings produced by Brendan O'Brien (record producer)
Songs written by Angus Young
Songs written by Malcolm Young
Sony Music Australia singles
Music videos directed by David Mallet (director)